Edwin Reed Ridgely (May 9, 1844 – April 23, 1927) was a U.S. Representative from Kansas.

Biography
Born near Lancaster, Illinois, Ridgely attended district school in the winter months. During the Civil War enlisted as a private in Company C, One Hundred and Fifteenth Regiment, Illinois Volunteer Infantry, in 1862. He was promoted to sergeant and served until the end of the war.

He moved to Girard, Kansas, in 1869 and engaged in general merchandising and in agricultural pursuits. He left the Republican Party in 1876 because of its financial policy. He lived in Ogden, Utah, from 1889 to 1893 and then returned to Kansas.

Ridgely was elected as a Populist to the Fifty-fifth and Fifty-sixth Congresses (March 4, 1897 – March 3, 1901). He was not a candidate for renomination in 1900. He resumed agricultural pursuits in Mulberry, Kansas. He died in Girard, Kansas on April 23, 1927. He was interred in Girard Cemetery.

References

External links

 

1844 births
1927 deaths
People from Wabash County, Illinois
Kansas Populists
Kansas Republicans
People's Party members of the United States House of Representatives from Kansas
Union Army soldiers
People of Illinois in the American Civil War
People from Girard, Illinois
Members of the United States House of Representatives from Kansas